Kuybyshevsky Zaton (Zatun) is an urban locality (an urban-type settlement) in Kamsko-Ustyinsky District of the Republic of Tatarstan, Russia, located on the shores of Kuybyshev Reservoir,  from Kamskoye Ustye, the administrative center of the district. As of the 2010 Census, its population was 2,677.

History
It was established in the beginning of the 17th century and was granted urban-type settlement status in 1929. Until 1935, it was known as Spassky Zaton.

Administrative and municipal status
Within the framework of administrative divisions, the urban-type settlement of Kuybyshevsky Zaton is subordinated to Kamsko-Ustyinsky District. As a municipal division, Kuybyshevsky Zaton is incorporated within Kamsko-Ustyinsky Municipal District as Kuybyshevsky Zaton Urban Settlement.

Economy
As of 1997, the main industrial enterprise in Kuybyshevsky Zaton was the oil tanker service station.

Demographics

As of 1989, the population was mostly Russian (80.2%), Tatar (17.6%), and Chuvash (1.0%).

References

Notes

Sources

Urban-type settlements in the Republic of Tatarstan
Spassky Uyezd (Kazan Governorate)